Nitesh is an Indian masculine given name.

 Nitesh Pandey (born 1973), Indian actor
 Nitesh Patel (born 1989), English cricketer
 Nitesh Narayan Rane (born 1982), Indian politician
 Nitesh Tiwari, Indian director

See also 
 Nitesh Hub, former shopping mall in Pune, India